Tehran's Metro system is planned to consist of a total of seven lines; 7 lines (Lines 1–7), six of which are metro-service lines (Lines 1–4 and 6 & 7), are currently operational. Lines 1 and 2 cross each other at Imam Khomeini station. Line 5 is a suburban rail line that attaches to the Line 2 at the Tehran (Sadeghieh) station; it extends into the Karaj area and is connected to the rail line of city of Karaj & line Imam Khomeini Airport is a metro express.

Line 1

Line 1 consists of 32 stations.

Line 2

Line 2 consists of 22 stations.

Line 3

Line 3 consist of 26 (25 active) stations.

Line 4

Line 4 consists of 25 (22 active) stations.

Line 5

Line 5 is a suburban rail line that consists of 14 (12 active) stations.

Line 6

Line 6 is a line which consists of 31 (17 active) stations.

Line 7

Line 7 is a line which consists of 22 (20 active) stations.

Interchange stations
 1- Darvazeh Shemiran; Lines 2 & 4
 2- Shahid Beheshti; Lines 1 & 3
 3- Darvazeh Dowlat; Lines 1 & 4
 4- Imam Khomeini; Lines 1 & 2
 5- Theatr-e Shahr; Lines 3 & 4
 6- Shademan; Lines 2 & 4
 7- (Tehran) Sadeghiyeh; Lines 2 & 5
 8- Eram-e Sabz; Lines 4 & 5
 9- Shahed - Bagher Shahr; Lines 1 & 1
 10- Shahid Navvab-e Safavi; Lines 2 & 7
 11- Mahdiyeh; Lines 3 & 7
 12- Meydan-e Shohada; Lines 4 & 6 
 13- Meydan-e Mohammadiyeh; Lines 1 & 7 
 14- Imam Hossein ; Lines 2 & 6 
 15- Daneshgah-e Tarbiat Modares; Lines 6 & 7 
 16- Towhid; Lines 4 & 7 
 17- Shohada-ye Haftom-e Tir; Lines 1 & 6 
 18- Meydan-e Vali Asr; Lines 3 & 6
 19- Shohada-ye Hefdah-e Shahrivar; Lines 6 & 7 (under construction on line 6, operational on line 7) 
 20- Daneshgah-e Emam Ali; Lines 2 & 3 (operational on line 2, planned on line 3)
 21- Ayatollah Kashani; Lines 4 & 6 (under construction on line 4, under construction on line 6)

References

External links

 
Stations
Tehran
Tehran Metro
Railway stations
Metro stations